The European route E 403 is a European route connecting the Belgian towns of Zeebrugge and Tournai. This north-south route runs entirely on Belgian territory and falls together with the Belgian roads N31 and A17. 

European route E 403 passes through the following towns and cities:

Zeebrugge - Bruges - Torhout - Roeselare - Kortrijk - Tournai

Near Bruges there's a connection with the E 40 and near Kortrijk with the E 17.

External links 
 UN Economic Commission for Europe: Overall Map of E-road Network (2007)

499403
E403
E403